Colegio Inglés Saint John is a Chilean high school located in Rancagua, Cachapoal Province, Chile. It was founded in 1984 and its own by the Sociedad Rivera y Cía. Ltda..

References 

Educational institutions established in 1984
Secondary schools in Chile
Schools in Cachapoal Province
1984 establishments in Chile